Old Trafford Cricket Ground in Manchester, England was first used for cricket in 1857. The ground has been the home of Lancashire County Cricket Club since 1865. The first Test match held on the ground was played in 1884 and the ground has been used for One Day Internationals since 1972 and Twenty20 Internationals since 2008. Women's international cricket has also been played on the ground.

In cricket, a five-wicket haul (also known as a "five-for" or "fifer") refers to a bowler taking five or more wickets in a single innings. This is regarded as a notable achievement. This article details the five-wicket hauls taken on the ground in official international Test, One Day International and Twenty20 International matches.

The first five-wicket haul in international cricket on the ground was taken during the ground's first Test match in 1884, Australian Harry Boyle taking six wickets for 42 runs (6/42) in the first innings of a rain-affected Test match. The best innings figures in a Test match on the ground are Jim Laker's 10 wickets taken for the cost of 53 runs for England against Australia in 1956. Laker was the first player to take ten wickets in a Test match innings and followed his nine wickets taken in the first innings of the match.  Laker remains the only player to take 19 wickets in any first-class cricket match.

The first player to take five wickets in a One Day International innings on the ground was Australian Glenn McGrath who took 5/14 against West Indies on the ground during the 1999 Cricket World Cup.  India's Kuldeep Yadav is the only player to take a five-wicket haul in a Twenty20 International match at Old Trafford, taking 5/24 against England in 2018.

Key

Test match five-wicket hauls

There have been a total of 99 five-wicket hauls taken in Test matches at Old Trafford.

One Day International five-wicket hauls

Five-wicket hauls have been taken fives times in ODI matches on the ground.

Twenty20 International five-wicket hauls

Only one five-wicket haul has been taken in T20I on the ground.

Notes

References

External links
International five-wicket hauls at Old Trafford, CricInfo

Old Trafford